Moniaive railway station is the closed station terminus of the Cairn Valley Light Railway (CVR) branch, from Dumfries.  It served the rural area of Moniaive in Dumfries and Galloway, Scotland.

History 

The official opening day was 28 February 1905, accompanied by much local celebration, the first train of six corridor coaches being hauled by a Manson 4-4-0, Number 190. The journey to Dumfries took an hour and cost 2s. 6d. return fare. Archibald Wilkie from Kirkconnel station was Moniaive's first station master, replaced by George MacDonald whose last charge had been Ruthwell station.

From 1906 to 1907 a bus ran from Thornhill to Moniaive to cater for prospective passengers, however it was not a success.
The CVR was nominally independent, but was in reality controlled by the Glasgow and South Western Railway. The line was closed to passengers on 3 May 1943, during WW2 and to freight in 1949 on 4 July, and the track lifted in 1953. 1947 is also quoted as a date of complete closure. Moniaive had been one of the last places in Scotland to be connected to the railway network.

Home and starting banner signals were used, electrically controlled, for each direction.
Trains were, at that time uniquely, controlled by a development of the Syke's 'lock and block' system whereby the trains operated treadles on the single line to interact with the block instruments.

The station building was extended to provide the station master with his own office in October 1916.

During WW2 large numbers of Norwegian troops travelled to and from Moniaive whilst encamped nearby.

In 1921 the Moniaive engine shed was closed and from that point the first train of the day ran from Dumfries.

In 2014 a proposal was put forward to relocate the station building to the Scottish Railway Preservation Society's Manuel station on the Bo'ness and Kinneil line.

Views at the station in 2009

See also 

 List of closed railway stations in Britain

References

Notes

Sources 
 
 Armstrong, Charles. Moniaive Station. Sou'West. Summer 2015. No.170.
 Kirkpatrick, Ian (2000). The Cairn Valley Light Railway. Usk : The Oakwood Press. 
 Sanders, Keith and Hodgins, Douglas (1995). British Railways. Past and Present South West Scotland. No. 19. .
 Thomas, David St John & Whitehouse, Patrick (1993). The Romance of Scotlands Railways. Newton Abbot : David St John Thomas. .

External links
 Geograph photograph of Moniaive station

Disused railway stations in Dumfries and Galloway
Former Glasgow and South Western Railway stations
Railway stations in Great Britain opened in 1905
Railway stations in Great Britain closed in 1943